Semyonovskoye is a rural locality (a selo) and the administrative centre of Semyonovsky Selsoviet, Baymaksky District, Bashkortostan, Russia. The population was 276 as of 2010.

Geography 
Semyonovskoye is located 11 km south of Baymak (the district's administrative centre) by road. Munasipovo is the nearest rural locality.

References 

Rural localities in Baymaksky District